John Edmonstone was a taxidermist and teacher of taxidermy in Edinburgh, Scotland. He was an influential Black Briton.

Born into slavery on a wood plantation in Demerara, British Guiana (present-day Guyana, South America), he was given the surname of his slave-owner, Charles Edmonstone, who owned the plantation and also owned the Cardross Park estate at Cardross, near Dumbarton in Scotland. Around 1812 the plantation was visited by the naturalist Charles Waterton, who spent considerable time teaching John Edmonstone taxidermy.

In 1817 Edmonstone came to Scotland with his master, possibly to become a servant to the Edmonstone family at Cardross Park. Having come there, he was freed, and he took employment in Glasgow, then moved to Edinburgh where in 1823 he set up shop as a "bird-stuffer" at 37 Lothian Street. From this shop, he taught taxidermy to students attending the nearby University of Edinburgh, including Charles Darwin in 1826, when Darwin was 15. Having worked in hot climates, Edmonstone had learned to preserve birds rapidly before decomposition set in, a skill that may have benefited Darwin in preserving his Galapagos finches. Edmonstone also undertook work for the Royal Museum of the University. He moved his taxidermy shop to Edinburgh's main shopping thoroughfare, opening at 29 and then later 66 Princes Street. In the 1840s he moved shop again to 10 South St David's Street.

Edmonstone gave Darwin inspiring accounts of tropical rain forests in South America and may have encouraged him to explore there. The taxidermy Darwin learnt from Edmonstone helped him greatly during the voyage of HMS Beagle. However, Darwin does not mention him by name, so the identification of Edmonstone as Darwin's teacher is not completely certain and is based on the research of R. B. Freeman.

Legacy 
In 2009, a plaque to commemorate Edmonstone was commissioned by the London arts venue, Kings Place, to be made by Wedgwood porcelain firm. The plaque was put up at Negociants Bar, in Lothian Street, Edinburgh, but has since been lost.

Edmonstone is regarded as one of the "100 Great Black Britons".

A poem narrated from the perspective of John Edmonstone appears in the Winter 2019 issue of African American Review.

References

 Year of birth missing
 Year of death missing
19th-century Scottish scientists
 Academics of the University of Edinburgh
 Black British former slaves
Scottish people of Guyanese descent
Guyanese slaves
Charles Darwin
Taxidermists
People from Demerara-Mahaica